Seongnam Foreign Language School (Korean: 성남외국어고등학교, 성남외고 Hanja: 城南外國語高等學校), commonly referred to as SNFL is a national school located in Seongnam, South Korea.  SNFL offers regular high school courses with four different second language programs (English, German, Chinese, Japanese). The school year starts in March, it begins its second semester in September, and ends the school year in February.  The lowest educational expense among foreign language high schools

Academics - Foreign Language Program

Japanese
 Focus on systematic language learning through practical speaking exercises rather than grammar-oriented classes.
 Build effective communication competence through the understanding of Japanese culture and Japanese immersion classes.
 Provide individual instruction with learning activities based on each student’s level.

Chinese
Provide professional intensive guidance through team teaching (Chinese language teacher with native Chinese speaking teacher) and small group classes.
Operate new HSK preparation class through after-school activities as well as regular classes.
Host various programs such as a Chinese cultural festival, Chinese speech contest, publication of a Chinese newspaper, Chinese club activities, etc.

German
Acquire essential grammar elements that make up the basic German sentence structures.
Learn four language skills together with a focus on listening and speaking ability.
Systematically prepare for the SD and ZD test through educational activities such as regular classes with a native German teacher and after-school activities.

English
Operate conversation and writing classes tending to the students’ individual needs based on their level.
Acquire four language skills together through native English speaking teachers who have diverse major backgrounds.
Improve students’ fluency by providing authentic learning environments.

ABC Project(Humanities Research Paper Competition)
This program’s goal is to develop a self-directed learning skill by allowing students to choose a single or an
integrated subject and to perform a research project. This program offers research papers an opportunity
to be published in domestic and international journals.

FLIP(Foreign Language Intensive Program)
This is an intensive lecture program that helps students to acquire official certification related to their major.

Sports club
The sports clubs(soccer, basketball, badminton, ping pong, floor-ball, yoga, etc.) are operated to improve the basic
physical strength of our students and to create a sound school atmosphere.

Lifelong Education Center
Lifelong Education Center provides an opportunity for parents and local residents to continue learning. Programs
provided include artistic development academy class, flower arrangement class, and parents’ choir.

School life

School Dormitory
SNFL operate school dorm with various facilities (basketball court, tennis court, ping pong room, dance room, band room, and fitness room). Rooms that can accommodate all current students (Generally 4 people per room). Students can use language labs, international conference room, audio/visual room, video class system and also wireless Internet for their study or self-development.

The School's Park
The school has its own little park next to it for students and teachers to relax during the breaks. It contains a long path for walks, a wooden stage with an outdoor auditorium, a pavilion, benches and some fitness devices. The pathway leads up a hill and there are flowers planted around it.

Others
 Classes:
For the 1st year students, foreign language classes are divided into two small classes
according to students’ level and are taught separately by a native foreign language
speaking teacher and Korean teacher. The math classes are operated in a 2-2 class
system so all students can feel a sense of accomplishment.

References

Language high schools in South Korea
Seongnam
Educational institutions established in 2006
2006 establishments in South Korea